Lapisteride (INN; CS-891) is a dual inhibitor of both isoforms of the enzyme 5α-reductase. It was under investigation for the treatment of benign prostatic hyperplasia (BPH) and androgenic alopecia, but was never marketed.

See also 
 5α-Reductase inhibitor

References 

5α-Reductase inhibitors
Carboxamides
Abandoned drugs